Amir Maftah (born 25 December 1988) is a retired Tanzanian footballer. A left back, he played for Young Africans and Simba among others. He was also a member of the Tanzania national football team.

On May 18, 2010, Young Africans dropped Maftah from next season's player registration list over alleged indiscipline.

References

 

1988 births
Living people
Tanzanian footballers
Tanzania international footballers
Mtibwa Sugar F.C. players
Young Africans S.C. players
Simba S.C. players
Friends Rangers F.C. players
Association football defenders
Tanzanian expatriate footballers
Expatriate footballers in Mozambique
Tanzanian expatriate sportspeople in Mozambique
Tanzanian Premier League players
Tanzania A' international footballers
2009 African Nations Championship players